The Denver and Rio Grande Western K-27 is a class of  narrow gauge  "Mikado" type steam locomotives built for the Denver and Rio Grande Railroad by the Baldwin Locomotive Works in 1903. Known by their nickname "Mudhens," they were the first and the most numerous of the four K classes of Rio Grande narrow gauge engines to be built. Of the original fleet of 15 locomotives, two survive to this day and operate on heritage railways in the United States. No. 463 is operational on the Cumbres and Toltec Scenic Railroad (C&TSRR) in Chama, New Mexico and No. 464 is currently out of service due to a rebuild on the Huckleberry Railroad in Genesee Township, Michigan.

Origins 
Fifteen locomotives were built, originally class 125, they were reclassified as K-27s in 1924 when the Denver and Rio Grande became the Denver and Rio Grande Western Railroad. In the D&RGW's classification system, K was short for MiKado while 27 referred to the engine's 27,000 lbf of tractive effort. The K-27s were built as Vauclain compounds, with two cylinders on each side, expanding the steam once in the smaller cylinder and then a second time in the larger one. The extra maintenance costs of the two cylinders were greater than the fuel saving, so they were converted to simple expansion in 1907–1909. As a result, the K-27s were the Rio Grande's last purchase of compound locomotives. They were built with their main structural frames outside the driving wheels, with the counterweights and rods attached outside the frames.

They had one peculiarity which arose from their outside frames and counterweights. In places where the D&RGW's standard gauge system met the narrow gauge system, the railroad operated dual gauge trackage, with three rails, so that standard gauge equipment ran on the outer two rails and three foot gauge equipment ran on one of the outer rails and a third rail, inside the other two. Since the narrow gauge equipment was much lighter than the standard gauge, the inner rail was generally lighter and, therefore, not as tall as the standard gauge rails. When the shop crews trued up the drivers periodically, they had to be very careful not to go too far.

They pulled freight, passenger and mixed trains on the D&RGW in and over the Colorado Rocky Mountains, traversing the entire length of the railroad. Many of them also spent time on the Rio Grande's subsidiary, the Rio Grande Southern. In later years, some were used as switchers at the D&RGW's yards in Durango, Gunnison and Montrose.

Preservation

The last two K-27s built survive today. D&RGW No. 463 was sold to cowboy actor and singer Gene Autry in May 1955. Autry never used the engine and donated it to the City of Antonito, Colorado. It was restored by and entered into service on the Cumbres and Toltec Scenic Railroad (C&TSRR) in 1994. It was taken out of service with a broken side rod in 2002. In 2009, it was moved to the railroad's shop at Chama, New Mexico where a major rebuild was performed. The engine made its inaugural run after the rebuild on the C&TSRR on May 20, 2013. No. 463 was added to the National Register of Historic Places in 1975 as Engine No. 463.

The other K-27 in existence is D&RGW No. 464. It was the last K-27 in service on the D&RGW, retiring from active duty in 1962. It sat outside in Durango, Colorado until it was sold to Knott's Berry Farm, an amusement park in Buena Park, California, in 1973. It saw little or no use there, in part because of its condition and in part because of the counterweight clearance problem described above. The Huckleberry Railroad in Genesee Township, Michigan, near Flint, acquired the locomotive in 1981, did an eight-year restoration on it, and put it into active service. It last saw steam in early 2019 and is currently awaiting its next overhaul.

Details 
The K-27s went through a variety of modifications during their years of service.  They ended up in three distinct groups, with many different details such as the location of the air tanks, whether or not they had a doghouse on the tender for the head brakeman, and so forth.  The most important of these details are:

See also 
Rio Grande class K-28
Rio Grande class K-36
Rio Grande class K-37

References 

 O'Berry, Dennis. (1995). The Mudhens, A Photographic History.

External links 
K-27 Mikado History — Blackstone Models

K-27
Baldwin locomotives
2-8-2 locomotives
Railway locomotives introduced in 1903
Narrow gauge steam locomotives of the United States
Freight locomotives
Passenger locomotives
3 ft gauge locomotives